The Torneo Internazionale Stampa Sportiva (English: The Sport Press International Tournament) was an early international football competition. Held in 1908, it predated the more famous Sir Thomas Lipton Trophy by a year.

Organised by Italian La Stampa Sportiva (a weekly sports supplement to newspaper La Stampa), the Torneo Internazionale featured teams from Italy, France, Switzerland and Germany. All games were played in Turin, Italy. Swiss team Servette FC were eventual winners, beating Torino of Italy 3–1.

Overview 
The Italian football authorities, whilst pleased with the tournament, were aware that the absence of an English team made the tournament not truly 'international'. Thomas Lipton agreed and, in a gesture of thanks to the Italians who had honoured him, donated the Sir Thomas Lipton Trophy. He told them that he would organise an English team to participate in the next competition, that was held in 1909. 

Lipton wanted a team from the Northern League in England to come over to Turin and his decision led to the participation of West Auckland FC from County Durham in the 1909 and 1911 tournaments. The team of miners won both these tournaments. West Auckland experienced a heavy penalty for their participation in the Trophy. A statue to their success stands in the centre of their village today.

Qualifying 
(Italian only)

Qualifying final

Tournament

Participants 

Notes

First round

Third place

Final

References

1907–08 in European football
1907–08 in Italian football
Stampa Sportiva
Defunct international club association football competitions in Europe